Opsirhina albigutta is a moth of the  family Lasiocampidae. It is known from Australia, including the Australian Capital Territory, Tasmania and Victoria.

The wingspan is about 40 mm for males and 50 mm for females. Adults are grey with a white spot and two black-edged white lines on each forewing. The hindwings are brown.

The larvae have been recorded feeding on the leaves of Eucalyptus species.

References

Lasiocampidae
Moths described in 1855